The 8th (Belfast) Heavy Anti-Aircraft Regiment, Royal Artillery (Supplementary Reserve), was founded in the wake of the Munich crisis, and recruited mainly in the spring of 1939 from young men of the City and District of Belfast. It was mobilised and at action stations, manning its guns to defend Belfast, before war was declared on 3 September 1939.

World War II
In October, it left for practice camp in Cornwall, and thence to France, where it joined the British Expeditionary Force before Christmas. Following the German invasion of the Low Countries on 10 May 1940, all units were soon in action, but the fortunes of war resulted in evacuation from Dunkirk, Cherbourg, Saint-Malo and other ports during late May and early June. One troop successfully brought back four of its 3.7-inch Anti Aircraft guns and some vital gunnery instruments, despite having orders to blow them up. Back in England, the regiment was soon in action again during the Battle of Britain and the Blitz, first in Coventry, unit then ordered to London (Clapham Common) three days before Coventry was blitzed, the units road convoy took two hours to pass Green Road Roundabout on the outskirts of Oxford, such was its size, London and then on Teesside.

In the spring of 1942, the regiment embarked for the Far East in the Belfast-built liner RMS Britannic, and after a long voyage, escorted for a long way by battleships HMS Rodney, HMS Nelson & HMS Valiant at different times, reached Bombay. The guns and equipment were unloaded at Karachi and both elements assembled at Lahore before driving some 2,000 miles in convoy down the Grand Trunk Road to Calcutta. It was later transferred to East Bengal, before moving south to join XV Corps in Burma.

For the next two and a half years. the regiment took part in the Arakan campaigns, firing effectively against the Japanese Air Force and ground targets. Their accuracy at long range earned them the nickname “The Twelve Mile Snipers.” Some elements took part in the famous Battle of the Admin Box at Ngakyedouk (“Okeydoke”) Pass. Several officers and men received awards for gallantry following this heroic stand, which proved to be the turning point in the Arakan. At Easter 1945, a tablet to the memory of members of the regiment who died in the Arakan was unveiled in St. Mark’s Church, Akyab. This little, battle-torn church was one of the first in all Burma to be retaken, and men of the regiment assisted in restoring the building.

Postwar
When the war ended, the regiment was fortunate to embark at Madras as a unit, instead of being dispersed in age groups as was the common practice, and returned home to Ulster in another Belfast-built ship, RMS Stirling Castle. In 1946 the Regiment was placed in suspended animation.

Many of the officers and men came together again in 1947 when the Territorial Army was re-formed, and so helped to perpetuate the regimental spirit in a new organisation, the 245th (Belfast) (Mixed) Heavy Anti-Aircraft Regiment, RA (TA) with headquarters in Belfast. (245 HAA Regiment was considered the successor to 8th (Belfast) HAA Regiment, although that unit was continued by the regular 56 HAA Regt).

In 1955 the Regiment was amalgamated with four other Territorial Royal Artillery Regiments and reorganised to form 245 (Ulster) Light Anti-Aircraft Regiment RA (TA). In 1964 it was redesignated as 245 (Ulster) Light Air Defence Regiment RA (TA).

In 1967 the Regiment was amalgamated with the 445th (Lowland) Light Air Defence Regiment RA (TA) to form 102nd (Ulster and Scottish) Light Air Defence Regiment RA (TA). It became the 206 (Ulster) Battery Royal Artillery (Volunteers), is one of the most efficient units of the Volunteer Reserve today.

Notes

Bibliography
Doherty, Richard, 1992. The Sons of Ulster: Ulstermen at War from the Somme to Korea, Appletree Press, Belfast.
Doherty, Richard, 2009. Ubique: The Royal Artillery in the Second World War, The History Press, Stroud.
Litchfield, Norman E H, 1992. The Territorial Artillery 1908-1988, The Sherwood Press, Nottingham.

External links
https://ra39-45.co.uk/units/heavy-anti-aircraft-regiments/8-belfast-heavy-anti-aircraft-regiment-rasr
http://www.lennonwylie.co.uk/8th_belfast_haa_regt.htm

Heavy anti-aircraft regiments of the Royal Artillery
Military units and formations established in 1939
Military units and formations in Belfast
Military units and formations in Northern Ireland